Sirvi Arfani (born 11 February 1992) is an Indonesian professional footballer who plays as a forward for Liga 1 club Persita Tangerang.

Club career

Persita Tangerang
He was signed for Persita Tangerang to play in Divisi Utama Liga Indonesia in the 2011–12 season. Arfani made his first-team debut on 10 January 2011 in a match against PS Bengkulu and scored his first goal for Persita in a 0–1 win over Persip Pekalongan. Until the end of the season, he successfully brought his team promotion to the Indonesia Super League even though in the final match lose over Barito Putera.

On 19 January 2013, Arfani made his first Indonesia Super League appearance in Persita's starting XI in a 1–1 draw with Persipura Jayapura at the Mashud Wisnusaputra Stadium. He scored his first Super League goal of the 2013 season on 13 February 2013, scored a brace in a 3–1 home win over Persiba Balikpapan. He scored his goal on 27 April 2013, an equaliser in a 3–1 away lose over Persela Lamongan.

On 5 February 2014, Arfani scored his first goal of the 2014 season, scoring in a 2–1 lose over Persib Bandung at the Jalak Harupat Stadium. On 4 May 2014, Arfani scored a brace in a 4–0 home win to Persijap Jepara.

Persepam Madura United
In January 2015, he signed with Persepam Madura United. however, he is not making any appearances for his current club due to this season was officially discontinued by PSSI on 2 May 2015 due to a ban by Imam Nahrawi, Minister of Youth and Sports Affairs, against PSSI to run any football competition.

Return to Persita Tangerang
In early 2017, Arfani decided to re-join former club Persita Tangerang. Arfani scored his first league goal in the 2017 Liga 2 for Persita in a 2–0 win over Persika Karawang.

He scored his first Liga 2 goal of the 2018 season on 10 August 2018, coming on as a substitute in a 1–2 away win over Cilegon United.

On 23 June 2019, Arfani made his Liga 2 appearance in a match against PSGC Ciamis and then scored his first goal for the club in the injury time. On 2 July 2019, Arfani scored a hat-trick during a 4–0 win over Persibat Batang. with this result, he is listed as the first hat-trick in 2019 Liga 2. Arfani finished the season as leading Liga 2 goalscorer, with 14 goals, two ahead of Persiraja Banda Aceh striker Assanur Rijal in second and also successfully brought his team back to promotion to the Liga 1.

Arfani made his league debut on 6 March 2020 in new season 2020 Liga 1, coming on as a substitute for Samsul Arif in a 1–1 draw against PSM Makassar. And then, This season was suspended on 27 March 2020 due to the COVID-19 pandemic. The season was abandoned and was declared void on 20 January 2021. Arfani made his new season league debut on 28 August 2021 in a match against Persipura Jayapura at the Pakansari Stadium where he coming as a substitute for Ahmad Nur Hardianto.

Loan to RANS Cilegon
On 22 September 2021, Arfani joined RANS Cilegon on loan from Persita Tangerang for the 2021–22 season. Arfani made his Liga 2 debut for RANS on 28 September 2021, and scoring his first goal for the club against Dewa United.

Honours

Club
Persita Tangerang
 Liga 2 runner-up: 2019
RANS Cilegon
 Liga 2 runner-up: 2021

Individual
 Liga 2 Top Goalscorer: 2019 (14 goals)

References

External links 
 
 Sirvi Arfani at Liga Indonesia

1992 births
Living people
Indonesian footballers
Persita Tangerang players
Persepam Madura Utama players
RANS Nusantara F.C. players
Liga 1 (Indonesia) players
Liga 2 (Indonesia) players
Association football forwards
People from Serang
Sportspeople from Banten